The Central Great Mosque is a historic stone mosque situated in İlkadım, Samsun, Turkey. The mosque was first built during the Seljuk Empire period in the 1300s. The original structure caught fire in 1869 and was rebuilt in 1884. Today it is one of Samsun's most beautiful and historical mosques. The Central Great Mosque is located adjacent to the Samsun Clock Tower and Samsun Saathane Square.

History
The Central Great Mosque is one of the oldest surviving mosques in Samsun. The original Great Mosque was built in the 14th century by Hidir Bey, a military commander in the Seljuk Empire. The original mosque was built of wood, like most structures in Samsun, but was destroyed during the Great Fire of Samsun in 1869. In the years following, the site was cleared, and a new mosque made of stone was constructed. In 1884 the new mosque was opened for public use. The stone structure was designed by Batumlu Haci Ali. Sultan Abdul Haziz's mother funded the construction of this mosque. As a result of her involvement and funding of the construction, the mosque is also colloquially known as the Valide (mother) Mosque.

Architecture
The mosque is located in a large forested courtyard adjacent to Samsun Saathane Square. The mosque is made of cut stone. The central dome of the mosque is decorated with floral and geometric patterns. The structure has two large minarets on its western frontage. Both minarets have balconies and a simple stonework finish. The mosque has large arched windows which let in an abundance of natural light. There is an ornate central chandelier in the main prayer space.

The Mosque is serviced by the Büyük Cami Station of the Samsun Tram. The mosque is visible from Ataturk Boulevard in Samsun.

Gallery

References

External links 

Buildings and structures in Samsun Province
İlkadım
Indigenous architecture
Log buildings and structures
Seljuk mosques in Turkey